Leonel Gerardo Moreira Ledezma (born 2 April 1990) is a Costa Rican professional goalkeeper who plays for Liga FPD club Alajuelense and the Costa Rica national team.

Club career
Moreira came through the Herediano youth system and has only played for the Florenses.

International career
Moreira was in Costa Rica's 2007 FIFA U-17 World Cup squad.

He made his senior debut for Costa Rica in a July 2011 Copa América match against Colombia and has, as of May 2014, earned a total of 5 caps, scoring no goals. He was a non-playing squad member at the 2011 and 2013 CONCACAF Gold Cups.

In May 2018 he was named in Costa Rica's 23 man squad for the 2018 FIFA World Cup in Russia.

Career statistics

International
Statistics accurate as of match played 21 July 2021

Honours
Herediano
Liga FPD: Clausura 2012, Clausura 2013, Clausura 2015, Clausura 2016, Clausura 2017, Apertura 2019
CONCACAF League: 2018

Alajuelense
Liga FPD: Apertura 2020
CONCACAF League: 2020

Individual
CONCACAF League Golden Glove: 2018
CONCACAF League Golden Glove: 2020
CONCACAF League Golden Glove: 2022

Personal life
Moreira is married to Yuli Granados and they have a son, Santiago.

References

External links

Profile at Herediano

1990 births
Living people
People from Heredia Province
Association football goalkeepers
Costa Rican footballers
Costa Rican expatriate footballers
Costa Rica international footballers
C.S. Herediano footballers
C.F. Pachuca players
Club Bolívar players
L.D. Alajuelense footballers
Liga FPD players
Bolivian Primera División players
Expatriate footballers in Mexico
Expatriate footballers in Bolivia
Costa Rican expatriate sportspeople in Mexico
Costa Rican expatriate sportspeople in Bolivia
2011 CONCACAF Gold Cup players
2011 Copa América players
2013 CONCACAF Gold Cup players
Copa América Centenario players
2017 Copa Centroamericana players
2017 CONCACAF Gold Cup players
2018 FIFA World Cup players
2019 CONCACAF Gold Cup players
2021 CONCACAF Gold Cup players